Ceàrr was the first album by the Celtic rock band Mill a h-Uile Rud.  Ceàrr was the first CD of all-new Gaelic songs ever released and was also the first CD produced with exclusively Gaelic liner notes.  Runrig's album Play Gaelic was the first album of all-Gaelic music in a modern, rock and roll style, but along with new compositions, featured rock re-workings of several traditional songs, and Oi Polloi's EP, Carson?, was the first vinyl record of all-new rock compositions in Gaelic. Ceàrr is also notable for its sexual themes and strong obscenity; a rarity in the ultra-conservative modern Gaelic music scene.  The name of the album means wrong in Gaelic, and the band chose this name as a statement of their belief that you should use Gaelic, even if you don't feel entirely confident in the language.

Track listing
Dè mu a Dheidhinn, 2:53
Spàrr nad Thòn E, 2:49
Feumaidh Sinn Ruith, 2:41
Fèis Feise, 2:41
Mill a h-Uile Rud, 2:20
Ceàrr, 2:09

Notes

2004 albums
Mill a h-Uile Rud albums